Dark Days/Light Years, the ninth and most recent studio album by Super Furry Animals, was digitally released at 8pm on 16 March 2009 via the band's website, with a physical release following on the 21st of April on Rough Trade Records. The album's title is taken from a lyric in the song "Moped Eyes" ("dark days seem light years away").

Many of the songs on the album are based on riffs and grooves the band had been working on for several years. The band originally planned to record the album in Miraval, France like their previous effort Hey Venus!, but decided to record in Cardiff with a considerably lower budget than previous efforts.

The completion of the album was documented by a series of 22 short films that were shown on the Super Furry Animals website, with one film added each day leading up to its original digital release. The videos were inspired by the Mike Figgis film Timecode and were described by The Guardian as "at once enormously dull, pleasingly insightful and curiously compelling."

Longtime sleeve designer Pete Fowler collaborated with Hey Venus! artist Keiichi Tanaami to produce the album's artwork. According to Rhys Tanaami wanted to work with the band having seen Fowler's previous Super Furry Animals record sleeves.
The track "Inaugural Trams" includes spoken word German vocals by Franz Ferdinand's Nick McCarthy. The song impacted radio on April 21, 2009. The band broadcast a live show on their own website (superfurry.com) featuring songs from the album on the day of its digital release, which proved a success despite initial technical glitches. They didn't tour the album in a conventional manner, gigging infrequently.

The 12" vinyl release features different artwork from the CD version, and also has a free copy of the album on CD slipped inside the sleeve. The album peaked at #23 in the UK Album Charts in its first week of physical release. It may have charted higher but the band sold a number of pre-order copies and digital downloads via their website, which is not a registered chart company.

At just over an hour, it is the band's longest album.

To promote the album, lead singer Gruff Rhys described it as having a "biblical sound," and said that the band wouldn't be able to play any of its songs indoors.

Lyrical themes 

Singer and chief lyric writer Gruff Rhys has claimed that "The Very Best Of Neil Diamond" is about how you can't choose the soundtrack to your life" while "Inaugural Trams" is "a celebratory anthem regarding the opening of a new tram line in a fictitious utopian mainland Europe town". The current economic downturn is referenced briefly in songs such as "Inaugural Trams" and "Inconvenience". Rhys has described the writing process as "very collaborative".

Musical style 
According to Rhys the band made a "conscious decision really was not to include the slow numbers" on Dark Days/Light Years going on to state that "There are not a whole lot of chords in these songs; they're not as song-based in the conventional song writing. They've been developed out of band jams, but it turned out sounding like songs pretty much anyway".

Critical reception 

Dark Days/Light Years received generally positive reviews, with Metacritic, which assigns a normalized rating out of 100 to reviews from mainstream critics, giving the album a score of 84 denoting "universal acclaim".

Track listing

Personnel 
The following people contributed to Dark Days/Light Years:

Band 
 Gruff Rhys - vocals, guitar, electric saz, vocoder, keyboard
 Huw Bunford - guitar, bass guitar, electric saz, vocals
 Guto Pryce - bass guitar
 Cian Ciaran - keyboards, electronics, guitar, vocals
 Dafydd Ieuan - drums, vocals

Additional musicians 
 Nick McCarthy - Spoken word on "Inaugural Trams"
 Kris Jenkins - Percussion
 Jessica Rochman - Strings

Recording personnel 
 Chris Shaw – Co-Producer, Mixing, Engineering
 Super Furry Animals – Co-Producer
 Dave Newfeld – Recording of intro to "Crazy Naked Girls" (Miraval Studios)
 Stuart Hawkes – Mastering (Metropolis Mastering)

Artwork 
 Keiichi Tanaami – Artwork
 Pete Fowler - Artwork

Accolades

References

External links

Dark Days/Light Years at YouTube (streamed copy where licensed)

2009 albums
Super Furry Animals albums
Rough Trade Records albums
Albums with cover art by Pete Fowler